Milo Parker Jewett (27 April 1808 – 9 June 1882) was the first president of Vassar College and first president of Judson College, holding the office from 1861 to 1864, and 1838 to 1855, respectively.

Biography
Born in St. Johnsbury, Vermont, on 27 April 1808, Jewett was a graduate of Dartmouth College (1828) and Andover Theological Seminary (1833).
He became a professor of rhetoric and political economy Marietta College, resigning in 1838 after adopting Baptist tenets.

He founded Judson College in 1838 and served as president until 1855. He established Vassar College with Matthew Vassar in February 1861, serving as president until 1864, when he resigned from office following a disagreement with Vassar. 

In 1867 he moved to Milwaukee, Wisconsin, where he died on 9 June 1882.

Legacy
The Milo Jewett House at Vassar is named after him in honor of both his promotion of female education and his service to the college. Jewett Hall, located on the Judson College campus, is also named for him.

Publications
 Baptism (1840)
 Education in Europe (1863)
 Relations of Boards of Health and Intemperance (1874)
 The Model Academy (1875)

References 

 

1808 births
1882 deaths
American non-fiction writers
Dartmouth College alumni
Judson College (Alabama)
People from Marion, Alabama
People from St. Johnsbury, Vermont
Presidents of Vassar College
Vassar College faculty